Bang Sao Thong is a district (amphoe) of Samut Prakan province in central Thailand.

Geography
Neighboring districts are Lat Krabang to the north, Bang Bo to the east and Bang Phli to the west.

History
Bang Phli New Town (Thai Mueang Mai Bang Phli) was established between 1992 and 1993 as a residential area for high-income families. The area around the new town, comprising three tambons, was then split off from Bang Phli district and formed the new minor district (king amphoe), becoming effective on 1 April 1995.

The Thai government, on 15 May 2007, upgraded all 81 minor districts to full districts. On 24 August 2007 the upgrade became official.

Economy
Nissan has an automobile factory in the district. Nissan produces hybrid electric vehicles (HEVs) there based on its e-Power technology as well as batteries for electric vehicles. It has a production capacity of 370,000 vehicles a year.

Administration
The district is divided into three sub-districts (tambon), which are further subdivided into 39 villages (muban). Bang Sao Thong is a township (thesaban tambon) which covers parts of tambon Bang Sao Thong and Sisa Chorakhe Yai. Each of the tambons has a tambon administrative organization (TAO) responsible for non-municipal areas.

References

External links
amphoe.com

Bang Sao Thong